Kilbree are a Junior A hurling club from the south-west division (Carbery GAA) of County Cork, Ireland. Their sister club in Gaelic football is Kilmeen which competes at Junior A level. The club participates in Carbery and Cork competitions.

Honours
 Cork Junior B Hurling Championship Winners (1) 1984
 West Cork Junior A Hurling Championship: Winners (2) 2016, 2018
 West Cork Junior A Hurling League Winners (2) 2008,2018, 2021
 West Cork Junior B Hurling Championship Winners: (3) 1975, 1984, 2006
 West Cork Junior C Hurling Championship: Winners (3) 1994,2018, 2006 Runners-Up: 1992, 1997
 West Cork Minor C Hurling Championship: Winners (1) 1994 Runners-Up: 1997, 2003, 2005, 2011
 West Cork Under-21 A Hurling Championship: Runners-Up: 1985
 West Cork Under-21 B Hurling Championship: Winners  (5) 1978, 1982, 1984, 2009, 2016 Runners-Up: 1979, 1980, 1989, 1994, 1998
 West Cork Under-21 C Hurling Championship: Runners-Up: 2001
 West Cork Minor B Hurling Championship: Winners (1) 2008
 West Region Minor B Hurling Championship: Winners (1) 2014
 Cork Minor B Hurling Championship: Winners: 2014 Runners-Up 2008
 West Cork Under-14 B Hurling Championship:  Winners (2) 2009, 2011
West Cork under 15 C hurling Championship''':winners (1) 2022

References

Gaelic games clubs in County Cork
Hurling clubs in County Cork